Stibara lateralis is a species of beetle in the family Cerambycidae. It was described by James Thomson in 1865. It is known from Myanmar.

References

Saperdini
Beetles described in 1865